Ganja, a popular tourist destination in Azerbaijan is the second largest city of the country. The city is located 400–450 meters above the sea level, lies on the Ganja-Gazakh plain in the Kur-Araz lowland in the west of Azerbaijan, 375 km away from Baku. It is situated at the north-eastern foothills of the Lesser Caucasus mountain ranges on the Ganjachay river. Ganja offers a variety of tourist attractions, including its nature, historical sights, monuments, museums, theaters and other places.

Historic buildings

Mausoleums

Museums

Parks and gardens

Religious places

Cultural buildings

Squares

Shopping

Nature

Others

Places nearby

See also 

 Ganja, Azerbaijan
 Hajikend, Ganja

References

External links 

 Official website of Executive Power of Ganja
 Official website of Ganja city

Tourism in Azerbaijan
Tourist attractions in Ganja, Azerbaijan
Ganja
Ganja